Barticaria is a genus of beetles in the family Megalopodidae. It contains only one species, Barticaria cyaneus, found in Brazil and Guyana.

References

Megalopodidae genera
Monotypic Chrysomeloidea genera
Taxa named by Martin Jacoby
Beetles of South America